2-Pentanol (IUPAC name: pentan-2-ol; also called sec-amyl alcohol) is an organic chemical compound. It is used as a solvent and an intermediate in the manufacturing of other chemicals. 2-Pentanol is a component of many mixtures of amyl alcohols sold industrially. 2-Pentanol is chiral and thus can be obtained as either of two stereoisomers designated as (R)-(−)-2-pentanol and (S)-(+)-2-pentanol.

2-Pentanol has been detected in fresh bananas by gas chromatography–mass spectrometry, at an abundance of 14.26±2.63 ppm.

Reactions
2-Pentanol can be manufactured by hydration of pentene.

See also
 sec-Amyl acetate
 3-Pentanol

References 

Alcohol solvents
Alkanols